South Kelsey is a village and civil parish in the West Lindsey district of Lincolnshire, England.

According to the 2001 Census the village had a population of 571, increasing to 604 at the 2011 census.

South Kelsey has an Anglican church, St. Mary's and a village hall.

Further reading
Collins, Jean; South Kelsey: The History of a North Lincolnshire Village, U P Publications Ltd.

References

External links

Villages in Lincolnshire
Civil parishes in Lincolnshire
West Lindsey District